is a former Japanese football player.

Playing career
Atsuta was born in Machida on September 16, 1976. After graduating from Kokushikan University, he joined J1 League club Kyoto Purple Sanga in 1999. He played many matches as offensive midfielder from first season. However the club was relegated to J2 League from 2001. In 2001, he became a regular player and the club won the champions and was promoted to J1 in a year. In 2002, his opportunity to play decreased and he played many matches as substitute. The club won the champions 2002 Emperor's Cup first major title in the club history. In August 2003, he moved to J2 club Albirex Niigata on loan. However he could hardly play in the match. In 2004, he returned to Kyoto Purple Sanga. Although he played many matches as regular player, he retired end of 2004 season.

Club statistics

References

External links

kyotosangadc

1976 births
Living people
Kokushikan University alumni
Association football people from Tokyo
Japanese footballers
J1 League players
J2 League players
Kyoto Sanga FC players
Albirex Niigata players
Association football midfielders